Frederick Xavier Katzer (February 7, 1844 – July 20, 1903) was an Austrian-born prelate of the Catholic Church. He served as bishop of the Diocese of Green Bay in Wisconsin (1886–1891) and archbishop of the Archdiocese of Milwaukee in Wisconsin (1891–1903).

Early life
Frederick Katzer was born on February 7, 1844, in Ebensee, in the Austrian Empire (today part of Austria)  to Carl and Barbara Katzer. The family later moved to Gmunden, where Katzer received his early education while also working in a textile factory. In 1857, he entered the minor seminary at Freinberg, where he pursued his classical studies under the Jesuits.

Katzer was recruited by Father Francis Pierz for missionary work in the United States and, through a grant from the Leopoldine Society, he landed in New York on May 19, 1864. After arriving in Minnesota, however, the diocese informed him that he was not needed there. Katzer then considered joining the Jesuits, but Father Joseph Salzmann instead convinced him to come to Milwaukee, Wisconsin.  Katzer completed his theological studies at Saint Francis de Sales Seminary in Milwaukee.

Priesthood
Katzer was ordained a priest for the Archdiocese of Milwaukee on December 21, 1866, by Bishop John Henni. He was appointed to the faculty of Saint Francis Seminary, serving as a professor of mathematics, philosophy, and theology. In 1867, Katzer brought his parents to the United States. they first lived with him at the seminary, then later followed him to Green Bay and Milwaukee until his father's death in 1876 and his mother's death in 1895.

In July 1875, Katzer was transferred to the Diocese of Green Bay and named secretary to the new bishop, Francis Krautbauer. He also served as rector of Saint Francis Xavier Cathedral in Green Bay which was dedicated in November 1881. That same year, Katzer was appointed vicar general of the diocese.

Bishop of Green Bay
Following Bishop Krautbauer's death, Katzer was appointed the third bishop of the Diocese of Green Bay on July 13, 1886, by Pope Leo XIII. He received his episcopal consecration on September 21, 1886, from Archbishop Michael Heiss, with Bishops John Vertin and John Ireland serving as co-consecrators.

During his tenure, Katzer became an outspoken opponent of the Bennett Law, which required all public and private schools in Wisconsin to teach in English and was perceived as an attack by German-speaking immigrants. Katzer denounced the law as "a step by which Antichrist is trying to promote its attacks on the Church and accomplish its oppression by the state." In the 1890 election, the bishop strongly endorsed Democratic gubernatorial candidate George Wilbur Peck, who when elected signed the repeal of the Bennett Law in 1891.

In Katzer's five years as bishop, the number of Catholic schools increased from 44 with 5,292 students in 1886 to 70 schools with 10,785 students in 1891.

Archbishop of Milwaukee

The death of Archbishop Michael Heiss in March 1890 left the Archdiocese of Milwaukee vacant. To replace Heiss, the bishops of Wisconsin recommended three German-speaking candidates (in order of preference): Katzer, Bishop Kilian Flasch, or Bishop Henry Richter. Some English-speaking Catholics, however, opposed Katzer's nomination out of their desire to assimilate Catholic immigrants into American society rather than maintain their ethnic traditions. In particular, Archbishop John Ireland of St. Paul wrote to Cardinal James Gibbons to say that Katzer was "a man thoroughly German and thoroughly unfit to be an archbishop."

At a meeting of American archbishops in July 1890, the hierarchy instead named Bishop John Spalding as their top choice, followed by Bishop Martin Marty and Richter. The two lists of candidates, one from the Wisconsin bishops and the other from the country's archbishops, were then sent to the Congregation for the Propagation of the Faith. On January 30, 1891, in a victory for German-speaking Catholics, Leo XIII appointed Katzer as the third Archbishop of Milwaukee.

Katzer soon emerged as a leader of the conservative wing of the American hierarchy, which included Archbishop Michael Corrigan of New York and Bishop Bernard McQuaid of Rochester. In 1899, following the publication of Testem benevolentiae nostrae, Katzer praised Leo XIII's condemnation of "the errors called by the name of Americanism with all the more joy and gratitude because the decision of the infallible See appeared to us very opportune." The following year, he wrote a letter to the Vatican protesting the appointment of Bishop John J. Keane as archbishop of Dubuque, claiming that Keane belonged to the "liberal Americanists" and that his appointment to a nearby diocese would be hazardous to Milwaukee.

His early years as archbishop were dominated by controversies in which Katzer was a prominent figure. Peter Cahensly, a wealthy German merchant, presented a report to Leo XIII in April 1891 that claimed Catholic immigrants in the United States were leaving the faith due to a lack of priests and churches of their own nationalities. Many disputed the accuracy of Cahensly's report, and one newspaper editor accused Katzer of being "Cahensly's protege" and "conspiring with foreign powers." Katzer denied those allegations and wrote to Cardinal Gibbons, saying, "If I hold different opinions...is that a reason to belie me in manner which is almost diabolical?" He requested Gibbons to confer the pallium on him in an August 1891 ceremony where Gibbons forcefully denounced Cahensly and nationalism.

Katzer was a strong critic of Archbishop Ireland's Faribault–Stillwater plan, which would place parochial schools under the public school system with the provision that religious instruction would be given outside school hours. He added his name to a letter written by Archbishop Corrigan opposing the plan, and was considered along with Ireland for presenting both sides of the school question to Rome. Katzer was also a leading opponent of secret societies and fraternal organizations, calling for Rome's formal condemnation of the Odd Fellows, Knights of Pythias, and Sons of Temperance. Such a condemnation was later issued by the Holy Office in 1894 but bishops were given discretion in publicizing the decree.

Later life and death
At the beginning of Katzer's tenure in 1891, the archdiocese contained 227 priests, 268 churches, and 125 parochial schools to serve a Catholics population of 180,000. By his final year as archbishop in 1903, there were 329 priests, 321 churches, 148 parochial schools, and 280,861 Catholics.

Frederick Katzer died from liver cancer at Fond du Lac, Wisconsin, on July 20, 1903. He is buried in a small cemetery on the grounds of Saint Francis Seminary.

References

Sources
 

1844 births
1903 deaths
19th-century Roman Catholic archbishops in the United States
20th-century Roman Catholic archbishops in the United States
Roman Catholic archbishops of Milwaukee
Austro-Hungarian emigrants to the United States
Burials in Wisconsin
Roman Catholic bishops of Green Bay
St. Francis Seminary (Wisconsin) alumni